Friedrich Wettstein, Ritter von Westersheim (24 June 1895 in Prague – 12 February 1945 in Trins, Tirol) was an Austrian botanist.

Academic career
Fritz Wettstein was the son of Richard Wettstein. From 1925 he was professor at Göttingen, in 1931 in Munich and in 1934 director of the Kaiser Wilhelm Institute for Biology in Berlin-Dahlem.

Wettstein made a major contribution to botanical and genetical science. He worked especially on cytoplasmic inheritance in mosses and fireweed. Following Erwin Baur at the Kaiser Wilhelm Institut, Berlin-Dahlem, he investigated hybrids and polyploids of mosses, and advanced the understanding of the relationships and characteristics of polyploid forms.

Political implications
Wettstein has been criticised because at international scientific conferences before the war he defended National Socialist racial ideas.

Works
Morphologie und Physiologie des Formwechsels der Moose auf genetischer Grundlage (1924)
Über plasmatische Vererbung sowie Plasma-und Genwirkung (1930)
Genetik (1932) 	
Karl von Goebel (1933)

References

Bryologists
Academic staff of the University of Göttingen
Academic staff of the Ludwig Maximilian University of Munich
20th-century Austrian botanists
Austrian geneticists
Austrian knights
1895 births
1945 deaths
Max Planck Institute directors